According to the 2014 census, there are 37,241 Moldovan-Americans residing in the United States.

According to the 2012 U.S. Global Leadership Report, 38% of Moldovans approve of U.S. leadership, with 15% disapproving and 47% uncertain.

History
The United States recognized the independence of Moldova on December 25, 1991,  and opened the Embassy of the United States in Chişinău, in March 1992. The Republic of Moldova opened the Embassy of Moldova in Washington, D.C. in December 1993.

A trade agreement providing reciprocal most-favored-nation tariff treatment became effective in July 1992. An Overseas Private Investment Corporation agreement, which encourages U.S. private investment by providing direct loans and loan guarantees, was signed in June 1992. A bilateral investment treaty was signed in April 1993. A generalized system of preferences status was granted in August 1995, and some Eximbank coverage became available in November 1995.

In November 2006, the U.S. Millennium Challenge Corporation approved Moldova's $24.7 million Threshold Country Plan to combat corruption. The MCC also ruled that Moldova is eligible to apply for full compact assistance and the Government of Moldova is preparing its compact proposal.

The current United States Ambassador to Moldova, Kent Doyle Logsdon, presented his credentials on November 2, 2018.

Principal U.S. Embassy Officials include:
 Ambassador - Kent Doyle Logsdon
 Deputy Chief of Mission - Martin McDowell

See also 
 Foreign relations of Moldova 
 Foreign relations of the United States
 Moldovan Americans
 Transnistria–United States relations
 Moldova–Russia relations
 Moldova–NATO relations

References

External links
 History of Moldova - U.S. relations

 
United States
Bilateral relations of the United States